Moothala is a small village in Pallickal panchayat of Thiruvananthapuram, Kerala, India. Most of the people are farmers and middle-class families. It is 2 kilometers away from Pallickal town.
  Village office and moothala LPS school is situated on Moothala village

References

Villages in Thiruvananthapuram district